Shamsia Hassani (Dari: شمسیه حسنی) (real name Ommolbanin Hassani) (born April 9, 1988) is an Afghan graffiti artist, a fine arts lecturer, and the associate professor of Drawing and Anatomy Drawing at the Kabul University. She has popularized "street art" in the streets of Kabul and has exhibited her art in several countries including India, Iran, Germany, United States of America, Switzerland, Vietnam, Norway, Denmark, Turkey, Italy, Canada, and in diplomatic missions in Kabul. Hassani paints graffiti in Kabul to bring awareness to the war years. In 2014, Hassani was named one of FP's top 100 global thinkers. She was recognized as one of the BBC's 100 women of 2021.

Biography

Hassani was born in 1988 and spent her childhood in Iran; her parents had temporarily immigrated there, from Kandahar, Afghanistan during the war. Hassani showed interest in painting from a young age. While in the ninth grade, Hassani lacked access to art classes, as it was not permitted to Afghans in Iran. Upon her return to Kabul in 2005, she pursued a degree at Kabul University in arts. Shamsia holds a BA degree in Painting and a master's degree in Visual Arts from Kabul University in Afghanistan.

She later began lecturing and eventually became the associate professor of Drawing and Anatomy Drawing at Kabul University, establishing Berang Arts, a contemporary art collective. Creating colorful graffiti, Hassani works to mask the negativity of war. She claims that, "image has more effect than words, and it's a friendly way to fight." She also uses her art to fight for women's rights, reminding people of the tragedies women have faced and continue to face in Afghanistan.

Hassani studied the art of graffiti in Kabul in December 2010 during a workshop hosted by Chu, a graffiti artist from the United Kingdom. Following the workshop, Hassani began to practice street art on walls in the streets of Kabul. Because graffiti supplies are cheaper than supplies for traditional art forms, Hassani chose to continue with the art form. One of her works is on the walls of Kabul's Cultural Centre, and features a burqa clad woman seated below a stairway. The inscription below it reads (in English), "The water can come back to a dried-up river, but what about the fish that died?" In order to avoid public harassment and claims of her work being "un-Islamic", she completes her work quickly (within 15 minutes).

War and burqas 
In 2013, she told Art Radar: "I want to colour over the bad memories of war on the walls, and if I colour over these bad memories, then I erase [war] from people's minds. I want to make Afghanistan famous for its art, not its war."

Hassani mainly depicts stylized, monumental images of women wearing burqas. According to the artist, "I want to show that women have returned to Afghan society with a new, stronger shape. It's a new woman. A woman who is full of energy, who wants to start again." In an interview, Hassani explained, "I believe there are many who forget all the tragedy women face in Afghanistan; that is why I use my paintings as a means to remind the people. I want to highlight the matter in the society, with paintings reflecting women in burqas everywhere. And I try to show them bigger than what they are in reality, and in modern forms, shaped in happiness, movement, maybe stronger. I try to make people look at them differently."

As a female street artist, Hassani is often harassed: "It is very dangerous for a girl to paint in the streets in Kabul," she says; "Sometimes people come and harass me; they don't think it is allowed in Islam for a woman to stand in the street and do graffiti."

Digital art 
Hassani is also involved in presenting this art work in a digital format through her project titled "Dreaming Graffiti." This presentation is made in  a series in which she paints or "photoshops colors and images onto digital photographs to explore issues of national and personal security".

Graffiti and murals 

 Mural Painting for Wide Open Walls in Sacramento, California - USA (2018)
 Mural Painting for Eugene 20x21 Project in Eugene, Oregon - USA (2018)
 Graffiti for Istanbul Comic Art Festival, Istanbul - Turkey (2018)
 Participating in designing the character of Marvin the Martian - Looney Tunes (2017)
 Graffiti on the wall of Leonardo da Vinci's Institute, organized by Florence Biennale, Italy (2017)
 Mural Painting in Ventura, California - USA (2017)
 Graffiti for Art in Protest Exhibition for Human Rights Program in New York, USA 2017 (Oslo Freedom Forum)
 Attending and painting a mural at Millerntor Gallery in Germany - 2016
 Graffiti on the walls of Los Angeles, California - USA (2016)
 Participation and live graffiti at Oslo Freedom Form – Norway (2015)
 Graffiti in Art Management Workshop at Khoj - India (2013)
 Collaborating with El Mac on creating a mural in Vietnam (2012)

Exhibitions 

 Group exhibition, Traces of Words: Art and Calligraphy from Asia, Museum of Anthropology at UBC, Vancouver, Canada (2017)
 Painting exhibition at Vita Art Center, invited by ArtWalk Ventura, California - USA (2017)
 Painting exhibition at Seyhoun Art Gallery, Los Angeles, California - USA (2017)
 Painting exhibition at Elga Wimmer Gallery, organized by Roya Khadjavi in New York, USA (2017)
 Painting exhibition at Seyhoun Art Gallery, Los Angeles, California - USA (2016)
 Graffiti exhibition, conferences, and workshops organized by TERRE DES FEMMES, Switzerland (2013)
 Dreaming Graffiti exhibition in the embassies of Netherlands and Canada (2012)
 Graffiti exhibition in Australia (2012)
 Painting exhibition in the US embassy of Afghanistan (2012)

Honors 

 Recipient of Art Spectrum Award South Asia (Breaking New Grounds), Goa – India (2017)
 Artist in residency at Hammer Museum, UCLA – Los Angeles, United States of America (2016)
 Named one of FP's top 100 Global Thinkers (2014)
 Founder of the first National Graffiti Festival in Kabul, Afghanistan (2013)
 She was recognized as one of the BBC's 100 women of 2021.

References

External links

Living people
Graffiti artists
Afghan artists
Academic staff of Kabul University
Women graffiti artists
Women muralists
1988 births
People from Tehran
People from Kabul
21st-century artists
BBC 100 Women